Juana de Vega (1805-1872), was a Spanish author, liberal activist and courtier. She was the Camarera mayor de Palacio to the queen of Spain, Isabella II of Spain in 1841–1843. 
She was married to Francisco Espoz y Mina and known for her memoirs, novels and liberal activism.

References

1805 births
1872 deaths
19th-century Spanish writers
19th-century Spanish women writers
Spanish ladies-in-waiting